Blair Rodman (born April 5, 1954 in Troy, New York) is an American professional poker player, based in Las Vegas, Nevada.

Rodman has been playing poker professionally since 1985, when he quit his job dealing craps.
He has had numerous finishes in the money at the World Series of Poker (WSOP) in hold'em, seven-card stud, and Omaha poker tournaments. In March 2005, he made his first World Poker Tour (WPT) final table, finishing 2nd to Arnold Spee in the 2005 World Poker Challenge. In May 2005, Rodman made the final table of the Professional Poker Tour event won by Ted Forrest. He also made the final tables at the 2nd and 3rd Ultimate Poker Challenge grand finals, finishing 2nd and 6th respectively. He made a second WPT final table in February 2006, again finishing 2nd, this time to Barry Greenstein in the Pro-Celebrity Invitational event. On July 1, 2007, Rodman won his first bracelet, in the 2007 World Series of Poker $2,000 No-Limit Hold'em event, winning $707,898.

As of 2009, his total live tournament winnings exceed $2,200,000. His 34 cashes at the WSOP account for $1,360,232 of those winnings.

Rodman is the co-author, with Lee Nelson, of the book Kill Phil: The Fast Track to Success in No-Limit Hold 'em Poker Tournaments.

He is married to Roxy, whom he met while she worked as a poker dealer at the Mirage.

References

External links

 World Poker Tour profile
 Official Website for the book "Kill Phil."
 Blair Rodman's blog

American poker players
World Series of Poker bracelet winners
Living people
1954 births